Golubkin (from голубка meaning pigeon) is a Russian masculine surname, its feminine counterpart is Golubkina. It may refer to:
Anna Golubkina (1864-1927), Russian impressionist sculptor
Larisa Golubkina (born 1940), Russian actress
Nikolai Golubkin (born 1974), Russian football player

See also
Golubkina (crater) on Venus

Russian-language surnames